Sir Ralph Clarmont Skrine Stevenson, GCMG, MLC, CP (16 May 1895 – 23 June 1977) was a British diplomat.

He was the son of Surgeon-General, H.W. Stevenson and was educated at Wellington College and University College, Oxford. He married Helen Barbara Izabel Boreel on 27 October 1921 and they had one son and divorced in 1944. He had served in the Rifle Brigade during the First World War, becoming Captain in 1917. His diplomatic career began as 3rd Secretary to the Diplomatic Service in 1919; 2nd Secretary in 1921 and 1st Secretary in 1928. Moving through positions of acting Counselor (1937); Counselor (1938) he became Minister in 1941. During this period he served with the Foreign Office in missions at Copenhagen, Berlin, Sofia, The Hague, Cairo and Barcelona.

In 1943, he was appointed Ambassador Extraordinary and Minister Plenipotentiary to His Majesty the King of Yugoslavia, a post he held until 1946. He was the British Ambassador to China from 1946 to 1950. Stevenson was Her Britannic Majesty's Ambassador to the Kingdom of Egypt from 1950 to 1953 and later on to the Republic of Egypt from 1953 to 1955.  He was also a member of the Legislative Council of the Isle of Man from 1955 to 1970, as well as Captain of the Parish of Arbory from 1963 to 1976.

References

1895 births
1977 deaths
Ambassadors of the United Kingdom to Yugoslavia
Ambassadors of the United Kingdom to China
Ambassadors of the United Kingdom to Egypt
Captains of the Parish
Knights Grand Cross of the Order of St Michael and St George
Chairs of the Joint Intelligence Committee (United Kingdom)
Principal Private Secretaries to the Secretary of State for Foreign and Commonwealth Affairs
Members of HM Diplomatic Service
20th-century British diplomats